The Lüzu Temple (吕祖宫) is a Taoist temple in Beijing. Built during the Qing Dynasty, it is located near the Liulichang quarter in the old city.

References 

Taoist temples in Beijing